Blåbärssoppa or blueberry soup is a Nordic soup made from bilberries, which can be served cold or hot. It is sweet and contains starch, which gives it a fairly thick consistency. It is served either as soup, often together with porridge, or as a drink.

In the USA, blåbärssoppa is imported and sold under the trade name Blåbär. Blåbärssoppa can be home-made from bilberries, sugar, water and potato starch, or it can be bought ready-made or in powdered form, to mix with water.

The Swedish word for bilberry, blåbär, literally means "blueberry", but the beverage is not made from the North American blueberry (section Cyanococcus of the genus Vaccinium), but from the related but distinct bilberry, Vaccinium myrtillus, which grows in the wild throughout Scandinavia and other parts of Europe.

Uses
Blåbärssoppa is traditionally served to the participants at the ski marathon Vasaloppet, as it is rich in energy. Bilberries have traditionally been used to combat mild gastrointestinal ailments, and in Sweden and Finland, blåbärssoppa is often considered suitable food for people with an upset stomach, also because it is energy-rich.

See also
Kissel, similar dish in Eastern Slav and Baltic cuisines

References

Swedish soups
Non-alcoholic drinks
Fruit soups
Cross-country skiing in Sweden
Blueberries